Arthur Rigby (born 7 June 1900 in Chorlton-cum-Hardy, Manchester, England; died March 1960 in Crewe, England) was an English professional footballer who played as inside left or outside left. He won an FA Cup winners medal with Blackburn Rovers and five caps for England.

Domestic playing career
Arthur Rigby was an electrician by trade who initially started his football career as a goalkeeper until after a trial with Stockport County, signed as a winger for Crewe Alexandra after the First World War. In March 1921 he signed for Bradford City for £1,200 when City director Allan Welch took time away from business in Crewe to take him from non-league football to Division One. He played 13 games, scoring one goal, in his first season at City, before the club was relegated in his first full season.

He scored five goals in the club's first season in Division Two during the 1922–23 season finishing as the club's joint top goal-scorer. He remained at City for another two seasons, finishing with 21 goals from 121 league appearances, before he returned to the top flight when Blackburn Rovers paid £2,500 for his services.

His form at Ewood Park was rewarded with an international call-up for the England team and an FA Cup winners medal in 1928 when Rovers defeated Huddersfield Town 3–1. After 156 league appearances and 42 goals, he left Rovers to sign for Everton in November 1929.

He won a Second Division championship medal with Everton in 1930–31 season, before moving to Middlesbrough in May 1932. He later played for Clapton Orient and finished his career back at Crewe, where he died in March 1960, aged 59.

International playing career
Rigby won his first England international cap in a British Home Championship game with Scotland on 2 April 1927. England won 2–1. He scored two goals in his second game against Belgium a month later in a convincing 9–1 victory. In total he won five caps, scoring one more goal, all in 1927.

International goals

Honours
Blackburn Rovers
 FA Cup: 1928

Everton
 Football League Second Division: 1930–31

References

External links
England career profile

1900 births
1960 deaths
English footballers
English Football League players
Crewe Alexandra F.C. players
Bradford City A.F.C. players
Blackburn Rovers F.C. players
England international footballers
Everton F.C. players
Middlesbrough F.C. players
Leyton Orient F.C. players
People from Chorlton-cum-Hardy
Footballers from Manchester
English Football League representative players
Association football wingers
Association football inside forwards
FA Cup Final players